Tanked was an American reality television series that aired on Animal Planet and premiered in August 2011. The series followed the operations of the Las Vegas-based aquarium manufacturer Acrylic Tank Manufacturing, owned by brothers-in-law Brett Raymer and Wayde King. Brett's sister Heather, married to Wayde, is the company's accountant, and Heather and Brett's father Irwin Raymer (also known as The General) is the office manager.

Other regulars include shop manager Robert "Robbie Redneck" Christlieb and sales coordinator Agnes Wilczynski.

In 2012, Animal Planet re-released the entire series with additional text commentary from the cast under the name Tanked: Unfiltered. New episodes were shown on Fridays at 10pm Eastern Time. On March 17, 2018, Animal Planet announced that the series would end after the fifteenth season.
Tanked was also shown on the DMAX channel in the United Kingdom.

Series overview

Episodes

Season 1 (2011)

Season 2 (2012)

Season 3 (2012)

Season 4 (2013)

Season 5 (2013)

Season 6 (2013–14)

Season 7 (2014)

Season 8 (2014–15)

Season 9 (2015)

Season 10 (2016)

Season 11 (2016)

Special episodes (2016–17)

Season 12 (2017)

Season 13 (2017)

Season 14 (2018)

Season 15 (2018)

References 

General references 
 
 
 
 

2010s American reality television series
2011 American television series debuts
2018 American television series endings
Animal Planet original programming
Television shows set in the Las Vegas Valley